A list of films produced by the Marathi language film industry based in Maharashtra in the year 1955.

1955 Releases
A list of Marathi films released in 1955.

References

Lists of 1955 films by country or language
 Marathi
1955